is a Japanese former snowboarder and subculture tarento. He competed in the half-pipe snowboarding event at the 2006 Winter Olympics. His main activities and interests are anime, manga, video games, idol MC, and wotagei. He is also an onstage actor and has appeared in short films, which makes him a multi-tarento.

Narita's father is a snowboarding coach called Takashi Narita, his sister is also a former snowboarder, called Melo Imai, and his younger brother, Grim Narita, is a freestyle skier, snowboarder, and wakeboarder, among other sports, who plans to compete in the 2018 PyeongChang Winter Paralympics for snowboarding.

Main results

Filmography

Internet

Anime

TV drama

Variety

Stage

Short films

See also
Japan at the 2006 Winter Olympics
Wotagei

References

External links
Japan Olympic Committee profile 
Narita's retirement press conference at WWS Channel 

Japanese television personalities
Japanese male snowboarders
Olympic snowboarders of Japan
People from Osaka
1985 births
Living people
Snowboarders at the 2006 Winter Olympics
Snowboarders at the 2003 Asian Winter Games
21st-century Japanese people